Olga Alexandrovna Panova (born 7 January 1987) is a retired Russian tennis player. She was born in Krasnodar. Her younger sister, Alexandra Panova, is also a tennis player.

In her career, she won nine doubles titles on the ITF circuit. On 17 July 2006, she reached her best singles ranking of world No. 274. On 21 August 2006, she peaked at No. 192 in the doubles rankings.

Partnering Ekaterina Makarova in 2005, Panova was runner-up at the $75,000 Al Habtoor Tennis Challenge. She made her WTA Tour debut at the 2006 İstanbul Cup, partnering Vasilisa Davydova in doubles, but lost her first-round match against Yuliana Fedak and Eva Hrdinová.

ITF finals

Singles (0–2)

Doubles (9–11)

References

External links
 
 

1987 births
Living people
Sportspeople from Krasnodar
Russian female tennis players
21st-century Russian women
20th-century Russian women